Ri Hyang-mi (born August 15, 1985) is a North Korean short track speed skater. She won an individual bronze medal at short track at the 2003 Winter Asian Games. She was a competitor at the 2006 Winter Olympics in Torino.

External links

1985 births
Living people
North Korean female short track speed skaters
Olympic short track speed skaters of North Korea
Short track speed skaters at the 2006 Winter Olympics
Asian Games medalists in short track speed skating
Asian Games silver medalists for North Korea
Asian Games bronze medalists for North Korea
Short track speed skaters at the 2003 Asian Winter Games
Short track speed skaters at the 2007 Asian Winter Games
Medalists at the 2003 Asian Winter Games
21st-century North Korean women